John Coyne is the name of:
 John Coyne (politician) (1836–1873), Canadian barrister and politician
 John Coyne (writer) (born 1937), American writer of horror novels
 John M. Coyne (1916–2014), former mayor of Brooklyn, Ohio
 John Coyne (soccer) (born 1951), English-born football (soccer) player who played for Australia
 John N. Coyne (1839–1907), American Civil War soldier
 John F. Coyne, former CEO of Western Digital, retired 2013